Savannah Township may refer to:

 Savannah Township, Becker County, Minnesota
 Savannah Township, Butler County, Nebraska
 Savannah Township, Jackson County, North Carolina, in Jackson County, North Carolina

See also 
 Savanna Township, Carroll County, Illinois

Township name disambiguation pages